La Cage aux Folles (also released as Birds of a Feather) is a 1978 comedy film directed by Édouard Molinaro, based on Jean Poiret's 1973 play of the same name. It stars Ugo Tognazzi and Michel Serrault as a gay couple operating a drag nightclub in a French resort town, Rémi Laurent as the former's son, and Michel Galabru and Carmen Scarpitta as his new fiancée's ultra-conservative parents. The French-language picture was a Franco-Italian co-production by United Artists. 

The film was released in Italy on 20 October 1978 and in France on 25 October. A considerable commercial success, it became one of the highest-grossing foreign-language films ever released in the United States. It won the Golden Globe Award for Best Foreign Language Film and was nominated for three Oscars: Best Director (Molinaro), Best Adapted Screenplay, and Best Costume Design. Michel Serrault won the César Award for Best Actor. It was followed by two sequels, with Tognazzi, Serrault, and Galabru reprising their roles. The 1996 American film The Birdcage was also adapted from the same source material.

Plot
Like the play upon which it is based, the film tells the story of a middle-aged gay couple – Renato Baldi, the manager of a Saint-Tropez nightclub featuring drag entertainment, and Albin Mougeotte, his star attraction – and the madness that ensues when Renato's son Laurent brings home his fiancée Andrea and her ultra-conservative parents to meet them.

Cast

Production 
Exterior filming was on-location in Saint-Tropez and Nice, while interiors were shot at Dear Film and Cinecitta Studios in Rome, Italy.

Reception

Box office
, La Cage aux Folles has remained the no. 11  foreign-language film released in the United States of America. The film was the second highest-grossing film of the year in France with 5,406,614 admissions. In Germany, it received 2.65 million admissions, making it the 11th highest-grossing film of the year.

Critical response
On Rotten Tomatoes, the film has a 95% rating based on 21 reviews, with an average rating of 7.82/10. The site's consensus reads: "La Cage aux Folles is a fine French-Italian farce with flamboyant, charming characters and deep laughs".

Roger Ebert gave the film three-and-a-half stars out of four and wrote that "the comic turns in the plot are achieved with such clockwork timing that sometimes we're laughing at what's funny and sometimes we're just laughing at the movie's sheer comic invention. This is a great time at the movies." Vincent Canby of The New York Times wrote in a negative review that the film "is naughty in the way of comedies that pretend to be sophisticated but actually serve to reinforce the most popular conventions and most witless stereotypes." Gene Siskel of the Chicago Tribune gave the film two-and-a-half stars out of four and wrote, "For me, 'La Cage aux Folles' was over soon after it began. It's all so predictable. This could have been a Luci & Desi comedy routine. The film's only distinctive quality is the skill of its veteran actors in working with tired material." Kevin Thomas of the Los Angeles Times called the film "a frequently hilarious French variation on Norman, Is That You? and has the same broad humor and appeal but has been put over with considerably more aplomb." Gary Arnold of The Washington Post panned the film for "stale, excruciating sex jokes" and direction that "has evidently failed to devise a playing rhythm to compensate for whatever farcical tempo the material enjoyed on the stage."

David McGillivray of The Monthly Film Bulletin described the film as "a crude amalgam of Norman, Is That You? and John Bowen's play Trevor ... All shrieks, mincing and limp wrists, La Cage aux Folles also looks positively antiquated beside the sophisticated gay comedy of such as Craig Russell."

Awards and nominations

Legacy

Sequels
The film was followed by two sequels: La Cage aux Folles II (1980), also directed by Molinaro, and La Cage aux Folles 3 - 'Elles' se marient (1985), directed by Georges Lautner.

Musical adaptation
The 1983 Broadway musical La Cage aux Folles based on the play and the film was also successful.

American remake
The 1996 American remake The Birdcage, directed by Mike Nichols and written by Elaine May, relocated the plot to South Beach, starring Robin Williams and Nathan Lane.

Mentions 
La Cage Aux Folles is mentioned in the 1993 teen comedy movie Anything for Love, a.k.a. Just One of the Girls. When the PE teacher finds out the main character is a boy dressing as a girl, she says "I thought you were gay. Not auditioning for La Cage Aux Folles."

Adam and Yves

La Cage aux Folles caught the attention of television producer Danny Arnold, who in 1979 pitched the concept of a weekly series about a gay couple similar to the one in the film to ABC. His planned title was Adam and Yves, a play on both Adam and Eve and a slogan used by some anti-gay groups. After months in development, Arnold realized that the concept was unsustainable as a weekly series, which led to the show getting dropped.

References

Literature

External links
 
 
 
La Cage aux Folles: Folles Family Values an essay by David Ehrenstein at the Criterion Collection

1978 films
1970s French-language films
1970s Italian-language films
1978 LGBT-related films
1970s multilingual films
1970s sex comedy films
French LGBT-related films
French sex comedy films
French multilingual films
Italian multilingual films
Italian sex comedy films
Italian LGBT-related films
Homophobia in fiction
Films about anti-LGBT sentiment
Best Foreign Language Film Golden Globe winners
Commedia all'italiana
Cross-dressing in film
Films scored by Ennio Morricone
French films based on plays
Films directed by Édouard Molinaro
Films featuring a Best Actor César Award-winning performance
Gay-related films
LGBT-related sex comedy films
1978 comedy films
Drag (clothing)-related films
Films shot in Rome
Films shot in Nice
Films shot in Saint-Tropez
Films set in Saint-Tropez
Films shot at Cinecittà Studios
1970s Italian films
1970s French films
Films set in nightclubs
Films with screenplays by Francis Veber